Greenline Express is a city bus company in the Philippines, plying the route SM Fairview-Baclaran via Taft Ave. Quezon Ave. Their office is located at Fairview, Quezon City.

History

The company was formed by the remnants of Northzone Transport, one of the pioneer bus companies plying the route. They slowly replaced their aging Japanese City Buses, first by acquiring brand new Hino RK1JMT buses, and after that using Isuzu buses. Recently, they acquired a fleet of Hyundai Aero City and Hyundai Aero to augment their existing fleet.

Fleet

Greenline Express utilizes and maintains a total of 15 buses, of which the present units are the following:

Hino RK1JMT
Isuzu LV314 (Isuzu Cubic)
Hyundai Aero City
Nissan Diesel CPB87N
Hyundai Aero
UD Trucks PKB212N (1 units only)

The following are the former units under its former name Northzone Transport.

Nissan Diesel UA (U32L)
Mitsubishi Fuso MP
Isuzu Cubic

Gallery

See also
 List of bus companies of the Philippines

References

Bus companies of the Philippines
Companies based in Quezon City